Ruthless is an American drama series created, executive produced, written, and directed by Tyler Perry. The series is produced under Perry's overall deal with Viacom/CBS. It is a spin-off from the BET drama The Oval. The first season of 24-episodes premiered on March 19, 2020, on BET+. Starting on February 23, 2021, the show began airing on BET following new episodes of The Oval. Season 2 premiered on March 11, 2021. Season 3 premiered on March 10, 2022. The show has attracted a cult following.

Plot
In a backdoor pilot during the first three episodes of The Oval, Ruth Truesdale (Melissa L. Williams) kidnaps her daughter Callie to join her and the sex-crazed members of the Rakudushis cult. Ruth is a devoted member of the Rakudushi cult. After helping to severely punish her rebellious, best friend Tally, she becomes an "Elder," a high-ranking member of the cult. However, in order to be initiated into the position of Elder, she was required to be gang-raped by seven high-ranking cult members, including Andrew and Dikhan, in the presence of The Highest. After being gang-raped, Ruth no longer wants to be a member of the cult and began planning an escape, along with her best friend, Tally.

The leader of the Rakudushis is "the Highest" (Matt Cedeño). The Highest has long hair and is always wearing white. His demeanor is very calm, peaceful, and welcoming. This is to cover up the fact that he is a sexual sadist. He uses drugs to make newcomers black out and lose all memory in order to violently rape them. He himself is also a drug addict.

Dikhan (Lenny Thomas), is a high-ranking cult member who is the right hand to The Highest. He is the overseer of everything that happens on the cult's property. Dikhan is very handsome and loyal to The Highest, but he is also extremely invasive and stern. It is revealed in Season one, episode seven, that Dikhan and The Highest have been in a homosexual relationship for twelve years. However, Dikhan is bisexual. He has been having a secret affair with Ruth and is also attracted to Lynn (Nirdine Brown). Dikhan has fallen in love with Ruth, however, Ruth is only using him to plan her escape from the cult. Dikhan is under the impression that Ruth is pregnant with his child. He has to hide his feelings for Ruth because of his relationship with the Highest. It is also against the rules of the cult. The Highest becomes suspicious about Dikhan and Ruth, after smelling Ruth's soap on him. The Highest's fondness of Andrew and River causes Dikhan to become jealous and insecure. Members of all ranks of the cult fear Dikhan. Dikhan reports all wrongdoing of the cult members to The Highest and often recommends and inflicts their punishment.

The Rakudushi cult was infiltrated by undercover FBI agent Andrew (Blue Kimble) who eventually converted his beliefs into that of the religious sex cult and is in the process of becoming a high-ranking member of the Rakadushis. Andrew is married to Sarah and they have one son. After infiltrating and becoming an unwavering believer of the Rakadushi religion, he began a secret, forbidden, sexual affair with Tally (Yvonne Senat Jones), who is also a member of the Rakadushi cult. Andrew falls in love with Tally, and eventually gets her pregnant. Tally does not know that Andrew is an undercover FBI agent who is also married. Andrew is a very loyal member and believer of the Rakadushi cult and its beliefs. However, he is frequently torn between his beliefs and his love for Tally, when Tally is severely and continuously punished for her mistakes and rebellious behavior. Tally questions Andrew's love for her after finding out Andrew was one of the seven men who gang-raped Ruth. Andrew had homosexual sex with The Highest one time, proving his loyalty to the cult, but causing friction between him and Dikhan, due to Dikhan being in love with The Highest.

Cast and characters

Main

Recurring
Kelvin Hair as Boboconati Smith
Zephaniah Terry as William
Robert Craighead as Sheriff Walker Conley
Derek A. Dixon as Dale
Ashleigh Morghan as Melinda
Jeremy Palko as Deputy Billy Poke
David Bianchi as Lilo
Rhonda Stubbins White as Agnes

Production

Development
The series was picked up by BET+ on November 7, 2019, with 24 episode order. The first season was shot over the course of 13 days in Atlanta. As production began during the height of the COVID pandemic, it was filmed in a quarantine "bubble" at Tyler Perry Studios in Atlanta.

Casting
Melissa Williams plays the lead role, after previously appearing on The Oval.  New series regular cast members were announced in October 2020 to appear from the second season. Kelvin Hair was announced as a recurring cast member in March 2021.

Episodes

Series overview

Season 1 (2020–21)

Season 2 (2021–22)

Season 3 (2022)

References

External links

2020 American television series debuts
2020s American black television series
2020s American drama television series
American television soap operas
American television spin-offs
BET+ original programming
English-language television shows
Television series by Tyler Perry Studios
Television series created by Tyler Perry